Vanessa M. Hirsch is a Canadian-American veterinary pathologist and scientist. She is a senior investigator and chief of the nonhuman primate virology section at the National Institute of Allergy and Infectious Diseases. Hirsch researches AIDS pathogenesis, the evolution and origins of primate lentiviruses, and HIV vaccine development.

Education 
Hirsch received a D.V.M. from the University of Saskatchewan in 1977 where she did a residency in pathology. She became board certified by the American College of Veterinary Pathologists in 1984. Hirsch earned her D.Sc. degree from Harvard T.H. Chan School of Public Health in 1988. Her dissertation was titled Structure of the simian immune immunodeficiency virus and its relationship to human immunodeficiency viruses.

Career and research 
Hirsch was a research assistant professor at Georgetown University until 1992, when she joined the National Institute of Allergy and Infectious Diseases Laboratory of Infectious Diseases, transferring to the Laboratory of Molecular Microbiology in 1999 and becoming tenured in 2002. She is a senior investigator and chief of the nonhuman primate virology section. Hirsch researches AIDS pathogenesis, the evolution and origins of primate lentiviruses, and HIV vaccine development.

References 

Living people
Place of birth missing (living people)
National Institutes of Health people
21st-century American biologists
21st-century American women scientists
American pathologists
Women medical researchers
Women veterinary scientists
American veterinarians
Canadian veterinarians
University of Saskatchewan alumni
Harvard School of Public Health alumni
Georgetown University faculty
HIV/AIDS researchers
Canadian pathologists
Women pathologists
Year of birth missing (living people)
American women academics